Kenkichi (written: 健吉, 謙吉, 鎌吉, 鍵吉 or 憲吉) is a masculine Japanese given name. Notable people with the name include:

, Japanese weightlifter
, Japanese mathematician
, Japanese businessman
, Japanese nobleman
, Japanese sport wrestler
, Japanese sport wrestler
, Japanese triple jumper
, Japanese swimmer
, Japanese samurai and martial artist
, Japanese chemist
, Japanese painter
, Japanese potter
, Japanese general
 , Japanese architect
, pen name of Ishibashi Teikichi, Japanese writer and literary critic
, Japanese diplomat

Japanese masculine given names